George Weatherill (1 October 1936 – 23 January 2021) was an Australian politician and Deputy Leader of the South Australian Labor Party. From 1986 until 2000 he represented the Labor Party in the South Australian Legislative Council.

Weatherill came from England's industrial north. In Australia, he stacked wool on Port Adelaide's wharves before becoming an official with the Australian Government Workers Association (AGWA). He was the father of Jay Weatherill who was Premier of South Australia between 2011 and 2018.

Highly respected as an effective negotiator and organiser he was instrumental in 'cleaning up' aspects of the AGWA administration which was adversely affected by the "Thompson" affair - whereby the former AGWA Secretary absconded with union funds.

References

1936 births
2021 deaths
Members of the South Australian Legislative Council
Australian trade unionists
English emigrants to Australia
Australian Labor Party members of the Parliament of South Australia